Peter Stuhlmacher (born 18 January 1932 in Leipzig) is Protestant theologian, professor emeritus of New Testament studies at the University of Tübingen.

His book Jesus of Nazareth-Christ of Faith was published in 1993.

Works

Books

 - translated from the 1992 German title Biblische Theologie des Neuen Testaments

Edited by

Notes

Bibliography

 Paul's Letter to the Romans: A Commentary by Peter Stuhlmacher (Mar 1, 1994) Westminster John Knox Press 
 Revisiting Paul's Doctrine of Justification by Peter Stuhlmacher (Oct 10, 2001)  IVP Academic 

1932 births
Living people
20th-century German Protestant theologians
German biblical scholars
New Testament scholars
Academic staff of the University of Tübingen
German male non-fiction writers